A Lovely Way to Spend Christmas is the third studio and first Christmas album released by American singer and actress Kristin Chenoweth. Released on October 14, 2008, the album sees Chenoweth collaborating with jazz musician John Pizzarelli on "Sleigh Ride/Marshmallow World". Chenoweth stated she had desired to record a Christmas album since signing with Sony Classical in 2000 after being inspired by Barbra Streisand's A Christmas Album as a child. The album has peaked at #77 on the Billboard 200 so far, and has become her first album to chart on the Billboard 200.

Track listing
"I'll Be Home for Christmas" (Kim Gannon, Walter Kent, Buck Ram) – 3:28
"Christmas Island" (Lyle Moraine) – 3:12
"The Christmas Waltz" (Sammy Cahn, Jule Styne) – 3:00
"Do You Hear What I Hear?" (Noël Regney, Gloria Shayne Baker) – 4:08
"Sleigh Ride/Marshmallow World" (Leroy Anderson/Peter DeRose, Carl Sigman) – 3:39
"Sing" (Robbie Buchanan, Jay Landers, Charlie Midnight, Joe Raposo) – 3:00
"Silver Bells" (Ray Evans, Jay Livingston) – 4:12
"Come on Ring Those Bells" (A. R. Culverwell) – 3:11
"What Child Is This?" (William Chatterton Dix) – 4:13
"Home on Christmas Day" (Walter Afanasieff, Landers) – 4:00
"Born on Christmas Day" (Keith Andes, Buchanan, Peabo Bryson) – 4:15
"Sleep Well Little Children/What a Wonderful World" (Alan Bergman, Leon Klatzkin/Bob Thiele, George David Weiss) – 3:21

Bonus tracks

Personnel
Robbie Buchanan – piano, arrangements, conducting, keyboards, programming, producer
Jorge Calandrelli – arrangements
Kristin Chenoweth – vocals
George Doering – acoustic guitar, mandolin
Johnson Enos – backing vocals
Mick Guzauski – mixing
Bob Krogstad – arrangements
Jay Landers – executive producer
Harvey Mason – drums
John Pizzarelli – vocals (Track 5)
Eric Rigler – Irish flute
Aaron J. Sala – backing vocals
Beverley Staunton – backing vocals
Neil Stubenhaus – bass
Jonathan Tunick – arrangements, conducting
Randy Waldman – piano
Frank Wolf – engineer

References

Kristin Chenoweth albums
2008 Christmas albums
Sony Classical Records albums
Christmas albums by American artists
Pop Christmas albums